Coleophora pinkeri is a moth of the family Coleophoridae. It is found on the Canary Islands.

References

pinkeri
Moths of Africa
Moths described in 1982